Mawson Lakes is a railway station and bus interchange in the Adelaide suburb of Mawson Lakes. To the west of the station lies the Australian Rail Track Corporation standard gauge line to Crystal Brook. The northern ends of the platforms are under the Elder Smith Road bridge with elevators and stairs from the footpath down to the platforms.

History 

Mawson Interchange opened on 26 February 2006 and was the first new railway station built in Adelaide in more than 20 years.

Services by platform

Transport links
In addition to the train, Adelaide Metro operates bus routes via Mawson Interchange:
222: to City

click here to view timetable
224: Elizabeth station to City
411: to Salisbury Interchange
501: to City via the O-Bahn
565: to Ingle Farm

References

External links

Construction gallery Department of Planning, Transport & Infrastructure

Railway stations in Adelaide
Railway stations in Australia opened in 2006